Chandler Canterbury (born December 15, 1998) is an American former child actor.

Life and career
Canterbury was born in Houston, Texas, the son of Kristine and Russell Canterbury. He has an older brother, Colby, who is also an actor, and a younger sister named Shelby, an actress.

Canterbury starred in the thriller Knowing, and won a 2008 Young Artist Award for his performance as a sociopathic child following his father's murderous example on the television series Criminal Minds (2005).

He was seen in The Curious Case of Benjamin Button (2008), playing the title character at the age of eight, who has the dementia of an old man. In 2010, he appeared in the psychological thriller After Life. Additional roles include appearances in Universal's Repo Men (2010) and in Timothy Linh Bui's Powder Blue (2009). He appeared as a young Peter Bishop in the Fringe episode "Subject 13" (2011).

In 2013, he co-starred in The Host and played the lead character opposite Annalise Basso in Standing Up.

Filmography

Awards

References

External links 

 

1998 births
American male child actors
Living people
Male actors from Houston
21st-century American male actors
American male film actors
American male television actors